King Arthur Court is a residential subdivision split between Knox County and Anderson County, Tennessee. It is listed as a populated place in the Geographic Names Information System. There have been past efforts to get the county lines redrawn so the subdivision could be located entirely within Knox County.

References

Unincorporated communities in Knox County, Tennessee
Unincorporated communities in Anderson County, Tennessee
Unincorporated communities in Tennessee